Tomlinella is a genus of minute sea snails, marine gastropod mollusks or micromollusks in the family Zebinidae.

Species
Species within the genus Tomlinella include:
 Tomlinella insignis (Adams & Reeve, 1850)
 Tomlinella lamellata (Kuroda, 1960)
 Tomlinella miranda Viader, 1938

References